Botok or ꦧꦺꦴꦛꦺꦴꦏ꧀ (Bothok) (sometimes called as Bobotok in its plural form or Botok-botok) is a traditional Javanese dish made from shredded coconut flesh which has been squeezed of its coconut milk, often mixed with other ingredients such as vegetables or fish, and wrapped in banana leaf and steamed. It is commonly found in Javanese people area of Java Island (Yogyakarta Special Region, Central, and East Java.

Botok seems to be a byproduct of coconut milk production, to save and reuse the grated coconut flesh that might be otherwise discarded. Commonly, the grated coconut flesh flakes are discarded after squeezing it to acquire the coconut milk. However, by cooking them in banana leaf with additional mixture and spices, they can also be eaten as additional dish. Another way to save the grated coconut residue is to saute them as serundeng. Today however, to acquire tastier and richer taste, many recipes insist on using only freshly grated coconut flesh that still contains coconut milk. Botok is typically consumed with rice.

Preparation and serving
The grated coconut flesh is mixed with chilli, salt, pepper, lemon basil and salam (Indonesian bay-leaf) and additional ingredient. This mixture is placed upon a piece of banana leaf, and then the leaf is wrapped tight and secured with a stick, then placed on a steamer. The most basic botok usually uses simple and cheaper ingredients, such as minced tempeh, tofu or anchovy. After the botok is cooked, the banana leaf package is opened and served with steamed rice. After perfectly cooked, the grated coconut and sometimes the egg addition, acted as the binding agent of the whole botok ingredients.

Variations

To add flavor and nutrients, many botok recipes and variants might use additional ingredients as protein source, such as petai cina, belimbing wuluh, ares (the core of a banana trunk), mushroom, tofu, tempeh, anchovy, wahoo, catfish, salted fish, egg, salted egg, shrimp, minced beef or even bee larvae. The botok method is used in several variant ingredients, and also become the name of a dish prepared in this manner, for example:
Botok ares (the core of a banana trunk botok)
Botok belimbing wuluh (Averrhoa bilimbi botok)
Botok beluntas (Pluchea indica leaf botok)
Botok daging (minced beef botok)
Botok jamur (mushroom botok)
Botok lele (catfish botok)
Botok mlanding (petai cina or lamtoro botok)
Botok ontong (jantung pisang/banana flower bud botok)
Botok tawon (bee larvae for honeybee botok)
Botok tahu (tofu botok)
Botok tempe (tempeh botok)
Botok telur (egg botok)
Botok telur asin (salted egg botok)
Botok tengiri (wahoo botok)
Botok teri (anchovy botok)
Botok tempe tahu teri (tofu, tempeh, anchovy combo botok)
Botok udang (shrimp botok)
Botok wader (Silver rasbora botok)

Similar dishes
Buntil is prepared in a similar way, but used papaya or cassava leaves instead of banana leaves, making the wrapping edible as part of the dish. Botok is often considered as the variations of pepes, the cooking method using banana leaf. However botok is identified more specific by using shredded coconut flesh, while pepes usually contains no coconut at all.

The South African dish of bobotie is thought to be the derivative of Indonesian bobotok. It is however, quite different as it uses minced beef and eggs, with the absence of grated coconut and banana leaf package. The role of grated coconut and eggs as binding agent in bobotok seems to be replaced by beaten eggs, milk and shredded bread in bobotie.

See also

 Javanese cuisine

References

External links
 Botok tofu tempeh and anchovy recipe
 Botok Ikan Tenggiri (Wahoo) recipe
 Botok Ares (banana tree's trunk) recipe

Javanese cuisine
Banana leaf
Foods containing coconut
Anchovy dishes